In Greek mythology, Chione (Ancient Greek: Χιόνη Khione from χιών chiōn, "snow")  was the daughter of Boreas, the god of the north wind, and Orithyia a daughter of Erechtheus, king of Athens.

Chione was the sister of Cleopatra (wife of Phineus, king of Thrace) and the Argonauts, Calaïs and Zetes. According to a late, though generally accepted tradition, Chione was the mother of Poseidon's son Eumolpus whom she threw into the ocean for fear of her father's reaction; however, Eumolpus is rescued and raised by Poseidon.

See also
 Perchta, a pagan Germanic winter goddess

Notes

References 
 Apollodorus, The Library with an English Translation by Sir James George Frazer, F.B.A., F.R.S. in 2 Volumes, Cambridge, MA, Harvard University Press; London, William Heinemann Ltd. 1921. ISBN 0-674-99135-4. Online version at the Perseus Digital Library. Greek text available from the same website.
 Grimal, Pierre, The Dictionary of Classical Mythology, Wiley-Blackwell, 1996, .
 Hyginus, Gaius Julius, Fabulae in Apollodorus' Library and Hyginus' Fabulae: Two Handbooks of Greek Mythology, Translated, with Introductions by R. Scott Smith and Stephen M. Trzaskoma, Hackett Publishing Company,  2007. .
 Liddell, Henry George, Robert Scott. A Greek-English Lexicon. Revised and augmented throughout by Sir Henry Stuart Jones with the assistance of. Roderick McKenzie. Oxford. Clarendon Press. 1940. Online version at the Perseus Digital Library
 Pausanias, Pausanias Description of Greece with an English Translation by W.H.S. Jones, Litt.D., and H.A. Ormerod, M.A., in 4 Volumes. Cambridge, Massachusetts, Harvard University Press; London, William Heinemann Ltd. 1918. Online version at the Perseus Digital Library.
 Smith, William; Dictionary of Greek and Roman Biography and Mythology, London (1873). Online version at the Perseus Digital Library
 Tripp, Edward, Crowell's Handbook of Classical Mythology, Thomas Y. Crowell Co; First edition (June 1970). .

Greek goddesses
Women of Poseidon